Denis Barbet is a French para-alpine skier. He represented France at the 2002 Winter Paralympics and at the 2006 Winter Paralympics.

In 2002 he won the gold medal in the Men's Slalom LW11 event and the bronze medal in the Men's Super-G LW11 event.

In 2006 he won the bronze medal in the Men's Downhill Sitting event.

See also 
 List of Paralympic medalists in alpine skiing

References

External links 
 

Living people
Year of birth missing (living people)
Place of birth missing (living people)
Paralympic alpine skiers of France
Alpine skiers at the 2002 Winter Paralympics
Alpine skiers at the 2006 Winter Paralympics
Medalists at the 2002 Winter Paralympics
Medalists at the 2006 Winter Paralympics
Paralympic gold medalists for France
Paralympic bronze medalists for France
Paralympic medalists in alpine skiing
21st-century French people